Lazaros Arkhontopoulos (born 18 July 1958) is a Greek alpine skier. He competed at the 1980 Winter Olympics and the 1984 Winter Olympics.

References

1958 births
Living people
Greek male alpine skiers
Olympic alpine skiers of Greece
Alpine skiers at the 1980 Winter Olympics
Alpine skiers at the 1984 Winter Olympics
Sportspeople from Thessaloniki